Dongfeng station, is a station of Line 14 of the Guangzhou Metro. It is also the northern terminus of the mainline of Line 14, and the northernmost station of Guangzhou Metro. It started operations on 28 December 2018.

It is the only station on Line 14 to have a theme.

The station has 2 underground island platforms with 3 tracks. Trains usually stop at the outer 2 platforms. Platform 1 is a termination platform, whilst platform 2 is for trains heading to Jiahewanggang. Platforms 3 and 4 serve the middle track.

Station Layout

History 
During construction, this station was referred to as Jiekou.

Exits
There are 3 exits, lettered B, C and D. Exit D is accessible. All exits are located within Dongfeng Estate.

Gallery

References

 Railway stations in China opened in 2018
Guangzhou Metro stations